Cossulus bolshoji is a moth in the family Cossidae. It is found in Kazakhstan, Kyrgyzstan and Uzbekistan.

References

Natural History Museum Lepidoptera generic names catalog

Cossinae
Moths described in 1936
Moths of Asia